Royston Thompson Taylor (21 July 1916 – 7 January 1987) was a New Zealand track cyclist who represented his country at the 1938 British Empire Games.

Early life and family
Born in the Auckland suburb of Remuera on 21 July 1916, Taylor was the son of Benjamin and Nellie Taylor.

Cycling
A member of the Papatoetoe Amateur Athletic and Cycling Club, Taylor won the 1000 m sprint at the trials to select the cycling team for the 1938 British Empire Games, beating 1936 Olympic representative George Giles in the final. However, at the Empire Games in Sydney, Taylor was unplaced in the sprint, while Giles won the bronze medal. Taylor also competed in the 1 km time trial at the Sydney games, finishing in seventh place.

Death
Taylor died on 7 January 1987.

References 

1916 births
1987 deaths
Cyclists from Auckland
New Zealand male cyclists
Commonwealth Games competitors for New Zealand
Cyclists at the 1938 British Empire Games
20th-century New Zealand people